Pongo is a village in the Longleng district of Nagaland state, India.

References

Villages in Longleng district